Marian Masłoń (11 February 1930 – 11 December 2004) was a Polish footballer. He played in two matches for the Poland national football team in 1956.

References

External links
 

1930 births
2004 deaths
Polish footballers
Poland international footballers
Place of birth missing
Association footballers not categorized by position